Chazara rangontavica is a butterfly species belonging to the family Nymphalidae. It is confined to the mountains surrounding the South-Tajik Depression, namely the Tabakchi and Rangontau mountains.

The wingspan is 45–60 mm. The period from May to June is when these butterflies fly.

References

 Satyrinae of the Western Palearctic - Chazara rangontavica

Chazara
Butterflies described in 1981